Ricardo Ramina (born 21 August 1951) is a notable Brazilian neurosurgeon and university Professor. Ramina is well known around the world for his expertise in the treatment of complex neurosurgical problems such as Vestibular schwannomas, skull base tumors, glomus jugulare, Meningiomas and Aneurysms.

Biography
Ricardo Ramina was born in Curitiba, Brazil, where he studied medicine at the Pontifícia Universidade Católica do Paraná. After graduating he moved to Hannover, Germany, in order to do a Neurosurgery residency under Prof. Majid Samii at the KRH Klinikum Nordstadt. After concluding his residency, Ricardo Ramina, continued to work at the KRH Klinikum Nordstadt, where he eventually became senior attending physician.

In 1986 Ramina moved back to Curitiba, Brazil where he founded the Institute of Neurology of Curitiba.

Ramina has written numerous scientific publication and books.

Present duties
 President of the Brazilian Neurosurgery Academy (2017)
 Chief editor of the Brazilian Neurosurgery Journal (2017)
 President of the Institute of Neurology of Curitiba (2017)
 Founding member of the Brazilian Society of Neurosurgery (2017)
 Member of the German Society of Neurosurgery (2017)
 International member of the Chilean Society of neurosurgery (2017)

References 
 https://www.abnc.org.br/organiza.php
 http://www.aen.pr.gov.br/modules/noticias/article.php?storyid=92128
 http://www.inc-neuro.com.br/index.php/br/neurocirurgia/userprofile/ramina.html
http://www.abnc.org.br/organiza.php
 http://lattes.cnpq.br/3735752413756868
 http://buscatextual.cnpq.br/buscatextual/visualizacv.do?metodo=apresentar&id=K4738170T6&idiomaExibicao=2

Brazilian neurosurgeons
Living people
1951 births